The Generalplan Ost, abbreviated GPO, was the Nazi German government's plan for the genocide and ethnic cleansing on a vast scale, and colonization of Central and Eastern Europe by Germans. It was to be undertaken in territories occupied by Germany during World War II. The plan was attempted during the war, resulting indirectly and directly in the deaths of millions by shootings, starvation, disease, extermination through labor, and genocide. However, its full implementation was not considered practicable during major military operations, and never materialized due to Germany's defeat.

The program operational guidelines were based on the policy of Lebensraum designed by Adolf Hitler and the Nazi Party in fulfilment of the Drang nach Osten (drive to the East) ideology of German expansionism. As such, it was intended to be a part of the New Order in Europe.

The plan was a work in progress. There are four known versions of it, developed as time went on. After the invasion of Poland, the original blueprint for Generalplan Ost (GPO) was discussed by the RKFDV in mid-1940 during the Nazi–Soviet population transfers. The third version was officially dated June 1942. The final settlement master plan for the East came in from the RKFDV on October 29, 1942. However, after the German defeat at Stalingrad, planning of the colonization in the East was suspended, and the program was gradually abandoned. The planning had nonetheless included implementation cost estimates, which ranged from 40 to 67 billion Reichsmarks, the latter figure being close to Germany's entire GDP for 1941. A cost estimate of 45.7 billion Reichsmarks was included in the spring 1942 version of the plan, in which more than half the expenditure was to be allocated to land remediation, agricultural development, and transport infrastructure. This aspect of the funding was to be provided directly from state sources and the remainder, for urban and industrial development projects, was to be raised on commercial terms.

Development and reconstruction of the plan
The body responsible for the Generalplan Ost was the SS's Reich Security Main Office (RSHA) under Heinrich Himmler, which commissioned the work. The document was revised several times between June 1941 and spring 1942 as the war in the east progressed successfully. It was a strictly confidential proposal whose content was known only to those at the top level of the Nazi hierarchy; it was circulated by RSHA to the Reich Ministry for the Occupied Eastern Territories (Ostministerium) in early 1942.

According to testimony of SS-Standartenführer Dr. Hans Ehlich (one of the witnesses before the Subsequent Nuremberg Trials), the original version of the plan was drafted in 1940. As a high official in the RSHA, Ehlich was the man responsible for the drafting of Generalplan Ost along with Dr. Konrad Meyer, Chief of the Planning Office of Himmler's Reich Commission for the Strengthening of Germandom. It had been preceded by the Ostforschung.

The preliminary versions were discussed by Heinrich Himmler and his most trusted colleagues even before the outbreak of war. This was mentioned by SS-Obergruppenführer Erich von dem Bach-Zelewski during his evidence as a prosecution witness in the trial of officials of the Race and Settlement Main Office (RuSHA). According to Bach-Zelewski, Himmler stated openly: "It is a question of existence, thus it will be a racial struggle of pitiless severity, in the course of which 20 to 30 million Slavs and Jews will perish through military actions and crises of food supply." A fundamental change in the plan was introduced on June 24, 1941 – two days after the start of Operation Barbarossa – when the 'solution' to the Jewish question ceased to be part of that particular framework gaining a lethal, autonomous priority.

Nearly all the wartime documentation on Generalplan Ost was deliberately destroyed shortly before Germany's defeat in May 1945, and the full proposal has never been found, though several documents refer to it or supplement it. Nonetheless, most of the plan's essential elements have been reconstructed from related memos, abstracts and other documents.

A major document which enabled historians to accurately reconstruct the Generalplan Ost was a memorandum released on April 27, 1942, by Erhard Wetzel, director of the NSDAP Office of Racial Policy, entitled "Opinion and thoughts on the master plan for the East of the Reichsführer SS". Wetzel's memorandum was a broad elaboration of the Generalplan Ost proposal. It came to light only in 1957.

The extermination document for the Slavic people of Eastern Europe did survive the war and was quoted by Yale historian Timothy Snyder in 2010. It shows that ethnic Poles were the primary target of Generalplan OST.

Phases of the plan and its implementation

Generalplan Ost was a secret Nazi German plan for the colonization of Central and Eastern Europe. Implementing it would have necessitated genocide and ethnic cleansing on a vast scale to be undertaken in the European territories occupied by Germany during World War II. It would have included the extermination of most Slavic people in Europe. The plan, prepared in the years 1939–1942, was part of Adolf Hitler's and the Nazi movement's  Lebensraum policy and a fulfilment of the Drang nach Osten ideology of German expansion to the east, both of them part of the larger plan to establish the New Order.

The final version of the Generalplan Ost proposal was divided into two parts; the "Small Plan" (Kleine Planung), which covered actions carried out in the course of the war; and the "Big Plan" (Grosse Planung), which described steps to be taken gradually over a period of 25 to 30 years after the war was won. Both plans entailed the policy of ethnic cleansing. As of June 1941, the policy envisaged the deportation of 31 million Slavs to Siberia.

The Generalplan Ost proposal offered various percentages of the conquered or colonized people who were targeted for removal and physical destruction; the net effect of which would be to ensure that the conquered territories would become German. In ten years' time, the plan effectively called for the extermination, expulsion, Germanization or enslavement of most or all East and West Slavs living behind the front lines of East-Central Europe. The "Small Plan" was to be put into practice as the Germans conquered the areas to the east of their pre-war borders. After the war, under the "Big Plan", more people in Eastern Europe were to be affected.   In their place up to 10  million  Germans would be settled in an extended "living space" (Lebensraum). Because the number of Germans appeared to be insufficient to populate the vast territories of Central and Eastern Europe, the peoples judged to lie racially between the Germans and the Russians (Mittelschicht), namely, Latvians and even Czechs, were also supposed to be resettled there.

Despite the proposal, Nazi Germany opted to install a puppet government lead by Yugoslav general Milan Nedic after conquering Yugoslavia in 1941. Despite the vast population of Slavs in Yugoslavia, Nazi Germany mainly focused on targeting the nation's Jewish and Roma population.

According to Nazi intentions, attempts at Germanization were to be undertaken only in the case of those foreign nationals in Central and Eastern Europe who could be considered a desirable element for the future Reich from the point of view of its racial theories. The Plan stipulated that there were to be different methods of treating particular nations and even particular groups within them. Attempts were even made to establish the basic criteria to be used in determining whether a given group lent itself to Germanization. These criteria were to be applied more liberally in the case of nations whose racial material (rassische Substanz) and level of cultural development made them more suitable than others for Germanization. The Plan considered that there were a large number of such elements among the Baltic states. Erhard Wetzel felt that thought should be given to a possible Germanization of the whole of the Estonian nation and a sizable proportion of the Latvians. On the other hand, the Lithuanians seemed less desirable since "they contained too great an admixture of Slav blood." Himmler's view was that "almost the whole of the Lithuanian nation would have to be deported to the East". Himmler is described to even have had a positive attitude towards germanizing the populations of Alsace-Lorraine, border areas of Slovenia (Upper Carniola and Southern Styria) and Bohemia-Moravia, but not Lithuania, claiming its population to be of "inferior race".

Lithuania, Latvia and Estonia were to be deprived of their statehood, while their territories were to be included in the area of German settlement. This meant that Latvia and especially Lithuania would be covered by the deportation plans, though in a somewhat milder form than the expulsion of Slavs to western Siberia. While the Estonians would be spared from repressions and physical liquidation (that the Jews and the Poles were experiencing), in the long term the Nazi planners did not foresee their existence as independent entities and they would be deported as well, with eventual denationalisation; initial designs were for Latvia, Lithuania and Estonia to be Germanized within 25 years; Heinrich Himmler revised them to 20 years.

In 1941 it was decided to destroy the Polish nation completely and the German leadership decided that in 15–20 years the Polish state under German occupation was to be fully cleared of any ethnic Poles and settled by German colonists. A majority of them, now deprived of their leaders and most of their intelligentsia (through mass murder, destruction of culture, the ban on education above the absolutely basic level, and kidnapping of children for Germanization), would have to be deported to regions in the East and scattered over as wide an area of Western Siberia as possible. According to the plan this would result in their assimilation by the local populations, which would cause the Poles to vanish as a nation.

According to plan, by 1952 only about 3–4 million 'non-Germanized' Poles (all of them peasants) were to be left residing in the former Poland. Those of them who would still not Germanize were to be forbidden to marry, the existing ban on any medical help to Poles in Germany would be extended, and eventually Poles would cease to exist.  Experiments in mass sterilization in concentration camps may also have been intended for use on the populations.  The Wehrbauer, or soldier-peasants, would be settled in a fortified line to prevent civilization reanimating beyond the Ural Mountains and threatening Germany.  "Tough peasant races" would serve as a bulwark against attackhowever, it was not very far east of the "frontier" that the westernmost reaches within continental Asia of the Nazi Germany's major Axis partner, Imperial Japan's own Greater East Asia Co-Prosperity Sphere would have existed, had a complete defeat of the Soviet Union occurred.

The seizure of food supplies in Ukraine brought about starvation, as it was intended to do to depopulate that region for German settlement. Soldiers were told to steel their hearts against starving women and children, because every bit of food given to them was stolen from the German people, endangering their nourishment.

Widely varying policies were envisioned by the creators of Generalplan Ost, and some of them were actually implemented by Germany in regards to the different Slavic territories and ethnic groups. For example, by August–September 1939 (Operation Tannenberg followed by the A-B Aktion in 1940), Einsatzgruppen death squads and concentration camps had been employed to deal with the Polish elite, while the small number of Czech intelligentsia were allowed to emigrate overseas. Parts of Poland were annexed by Germany early in the war (leaving aside the rump German-controlled General Government and the areas previously annexed by the Soviet Union), while the other territories were officially occupied by or allied to Germany (for example, the Slovak part of Czechoslovakia became a theoretically independent puppet state, while the ethnic-Czech parts of the Czech lands (so excluding the Sudetenland) became a "protectorate"). The plan was partially attempted during the war, resulting indirectly and directly in millions of deaths of ethnic Slavs by starvation, disease, or extermination through labor. The majority of Germany's 12 million forced laborers were abducted from Eastern Europe, mostly in the Soviet territories and Poland.

One of the indictment charges at the trial of Adolf Eichmann, the S.S. officer responsible for the transportation aspects of the Final Solution, was that he was responsible for the deportation of 500,000 Poles. Eichmann was convicted on all 15 counts. Poland's Supreme National Tribunal stated that "the wholesale extermination was first directed at Jews and also at Poles and had all the characteristics of genocide in the biological meaning of this term."

See also

 World War II casualties of the Soviet Union
 World War II casualties of Poland
 A-A line, military goal of Operation Barbarossa
 Areas annexed by Nazi Germany
 Barbarossa decree
 Chronicles of Terror
 Einsatzgruppen
 Expulsion of Poles by Nazi Germany
 Holocaust victims
 Manifest destiny
 Hunger Plan to seize food from the Soviet Union
 Nazi crimes against ethnic Poles
 Nazi crimes against Soviet POWs
 Nazism and race
 Racial policy of Nazi Germany
 World War II evacuation and expulsion
 Forced labor under German rule during World War II

Footnotes

References

Primary sources
 
  In

Further reading
 Bakoubayi Billy, Jonas: Musterkolonie des Rassenstaats: Togo in der kolonialpolitischen Propaganda und Planung Deutschlands 1919-1943, J.H.Röll-Verlag, Dettelbach 2011, . 
 Eichholtz, Dietrich. "Der Generalplan Ost." Über eine Ausgeburt imperialistischer Denkart und Politik, Jahrbuch für Geschichte, Volume 26, 1982. 
 Heiber, Helmut. "Der Generalplan Ost." Vierteljahrshefte für Zeitgeschichte, Volume 3, 1958. 
 
 Madajczyk, Czesław. Die Okkupationspolitik Nazideutschlands in Polen 1939-1945, Cologne, 1988.  
 Madajczyk, Czesław. Generalny Plan Wschodni: Zbiór dokumentów, Główna Komisja Badania Zbrodni Hitlerowskich w Polsce, Warszawa, 1990.  
 Roth, Karl-Heinz, "Erster Generalplan Ost." (April/May 1940) von Konrad Meyer, Dokumentationsstelle zur NS-Sozialpolitik, Mittelungen, Volume 1, 1985. 
 Szcześniak, Andrzej Leszek. Plan Zagłady Słowian. Generalplan Ost, Polskie Wydawnictwo Encyklopedyczne, Radom, 2001.   
 Wildt, Michael. "The Spirit of the Reich Security Main Office (RSHA)." Totalitarian Movements and Political Religions (2005) 6#3 pp. 333–349. Full article available with purchase.

External links
 Berlin-Dahlem (May 28, 1942). Full text of the original German Generalplan Ost document.  "Legal, economic and spatial foundations of the East." Digitized copy of the 100-page version from the Bundesarchiv Berlin-Licherfelde. 
 Worldfuturefund.org: Documentary sources regarding Generalplan Ost
 Dac.neu.edu: Hitler's Plans for Eastern Europe
  Der Generalplan Ost der Nationalsozialisten. 
 Deutsches Historisches Museum (2009), Berlin, Übersichtskarte: Planungsszenarien zur "völkischen Flurbereinigung" in Osteuropa.

Eastern Front (World War II)

Ethnic cleansing in Europe
Forced migration
Anti-Estonian sentiment
Anti-Latvian sentiment
Anti-Polish sentiment
Anti-Russian sentiment
Anti-Slavic sentiment
Anti-Ukrainian sentiment
German colonial empire
Holocaust terminology
Heinrich Himmler
Nazi SS

The Holocaust in Belarus
The Holocaust in Estonia
The Holocaust in Latvia
The Holocaust in Lithuania
The Holocaust in Poland
The Holocaust in Russia
The Holocaust in Ukraine
Axis powers
Nazi war crimes in the Soviet Union
Germanization
Genocides in Europe